{{DISPLAYTITLE:C7H5NO3}}
The molecular formula C7H5NO3 (molar mass: 151.12 g/mol, exact mass: 151.0269 u) may refer to:

 2-Nitrobenzaldehyde
 3-Nitrobenzaldehyde
 4-Nitrobenzaldehyde